Renée Aubin (born 17 October 1963) is a Canadian fencer. She competed in the women's individual and team foil events at the 1992 Summer Olympics.

References

External links
 

1963 births
Living people
Canadian female fencers
Olympic fencers of Canada
Fencers at the 1992 Summer Olympics
People from Beauharnois, Quebec
Sportspeople from Quebec